The city of Bristol, England, is a unitary authority, represented by four MPs representing seats wholly within the city boundaries. As well as these, Filton and Bradley Stoke covers the northern urban fringe in South Gloucestershire and the north eastern urban fringe is in the Kingswood constituency. The overall trend of both local and national representation became left of centre during the latter 20th century, but there was a shift to the right in the 2010 general election (although this was not reflected in the local elections).  The city has a tradition of local activism, with environmental issues and sustainable transport being prominent issues in the city.

On 3 May 2012, Bristol held a referendum to decide whether the city should have a directly elected mayor to replace the leader elected by councillors. The result was announced on 4 May. 41,032 voted for an elected mayor and 35,880 voted against, with a turnout of 24%. An election for the new post was held on 15 November 2012, with Independent candidate George Ferguson becoming the first Mayor of Bristol.

In 2017 the West of England Combined Authority and Mayor of the West of England were created covering the local authorities of Bristol, South Gloucestershire, and Bath and North East Somerset. Powers include transport and strategic planning for the combined areas.

Because of the 2020 COVID-19 pandemic, elections for the Mayor of Bristol, Bristol City Council councillors, and the Avon and Somerset Police and Crime Commissioner have been delayed from 2020 to May 2021, with current post holders terms extended by a year and the following terms shortened by a year.

City Council

The City of Bristol is a ceremonial county governed by a unitary authority; Bristol City Council.  The city is divided into 35 wards, which each elect one, two or three councillors for a four-year term (depending on the population of the ward).  The whole council is elected every four years. The election due in 2020 was delayed until 2021 due to the Coronavirus pandemic. Prior to 2016 ward boundary changes, all wards had two councillors, one third of the councillors were elected three years in four, but as only one councillor from any ward stood at a time, two-thirds of wards were competed each election.

The full council of 70 councillors has ultimate responsibility for establishing the decision making process and approving the Council's budget and policy framework. The council meets at the City Hall (known as the Council House up until 2012).  Full meetings are chaired by the Lord Mayor, a largely ceremonial role that does not hold direct power.  The Lord Mayor is a councillor, elected annually in May by the council members.

The elected mayor (not the Lord Mayor) acts as leader of the cabinet and appoints up to seven councillors as members. The cabinet is responsible for most day-to-day decisions though the elected Mayor retains the right to override cabinet votes.

Composition and control

Historically, the Council has been dominated by the Labour Party. However, in 2005, the Liberal Democrats became the minority administration. This lasted until just after the 2007 elections, when the Labour, Conservative and Green party groups joined forces to oust the Lib Dems and install a minority Labour administration. On 24 February 2009 the minority Labour administration resigned following a defeat over plans to build an incinerator in Avonmouth, and the Liberal Democrats resumed control.

In 2009, the election resulted in the Liberal Democrats taking overall majority control of Bristol City Council for the first time. In 2010 they increased their representation to 38 seats giving them a majority of 6. In 2011, they lost their majority leading to a hung council.

In 2012, the inaugural election for the position of Mayor of Bristol was held, with architect and former Liberal councillor George Ferguson being elected under the banner of Bristol 1st.

The 2013 local elections, in which a third of the city's wards were up for election, saw Labour gain 7 seats and the Green party double their seats from 2 to 4 while the Liberal Democrats suffered a loss of 10 seats. These trends were continued into the next election in May 2014, in which Labour gained 3 seats to take their total to 31, the Green Party built on their success by winning 2 more seats, the Conservatives gained 1 seat and UKIP won their first ever seat on the council. In another damaging result, the Lib Dems lost a further 7 seats. In March 2015, the only Independent Councillor on Bristol City Council joined the Conservatives, bringing their total up to 16.

In May 2015, the Green Party continued to increase their number of seats, winning 7 new seats (5 from the Lib Dems and 2 from Labour) and becoming the 3rd largest party on the Council, with the Lib Dems now in 4th. Labour also gained a new seat at the expense of the Lib Dems. The Lib Dem's decline was compounded later that month when one of the remaining Lib Dem Councillors defected to the Greens, leaving the Lib Dems with 9 seats and the Greens with 14.

The 2016 election saw Labour gain 7 seats and in turn regained overall control of the Council, with the Conservatives, Greens and Lib Dems all losing 2 seats and UKIP losing their only seat. Labour candidate Marvin Rees was also elected Mayor, ousting incumbent George Ferguson.

Because the COVID-19 pandemic, the 2020 election was postponed until May 2021. This election saw a surge in support for the Greens, with them gaining 13 seats, becoming the joint largest party on the Council and Labour losing their majority. Marvin Rees was re-elected as Mayor, with the Green's Sandy Hore-Ruthven coming in second place. In July 2021, the Greens elected a Shadow Cabinet to rival Labour.
The Liberal Democrats originally gained 8 seats in the election, however on 13 December 2021 former Lord Mayor Chris Davies and former Lib Dem Bristol group leader Gary Hopkins left the party to form the Knowle Community Party.

In December 2022, Alex Hartley, the Liberal Democrat councillor for Hotwells and Harbourside, resigned, triggering a by-election that was held on 2 February 2023. The by-election was won by the Green Party candidate, Patrick McAllister; elevating the Greens to the largest party on the council for the first time.

Current councillors

Current Cabinet

The Cabinet is led by Mayor Marvin Rees and currently consists of eight members (including Rees). All Cabinet Members are currently part of the Labour Party.

Current Shadow Cabinet

After winning as many seats as Labour at the 2021 election but not winning the mayoral race, the Greens elected a Shadow Cabinet on 6 July 2021.

Mayor

On 3 May 2012, Bristol held a referendum to decide whether the city should have a directly elected mayor to replace the leader elected by councillors. The result was announced on 4 May. 41,032 voted for an elected mayor and 35,880 voted against, with a turnout of 24%. The Lib Dems and Greens were publicly opposed to the introduction of a directly elected mayor, whilst Labour took a neutral stance and the Conservatives were the only party to support it.

An election for the new post was held on 15 November 2012, with Independent candidate George Ferguson becoming the first Mayor of Bristol.

Ferguson was ousted at the 2016 election by Labour candidate Marvin Rees, who was subsequently re-elected in the 2021.

On 7 December 2021, the majority of opposition Councillors backed a legally binding motion to hold a referendum on the future of the role of the Elected Mayor of Bristol. The referendum, which took place in May 2022, offered Bristolians the choice of keeping an elected mayor or going back to the committee system of governance that was in place before Ferguson became the city’s first directly elected Mayor.

Subsequently on 5 May 2022, the city voted to abolish the position in the referendum, replacing it with a committee system in May 2024.

Combined Authority

Since February 2017, Bristol has been part of the West of England Combined Authority. The Combined Authority was originally meant to cover the same area as the former county of Avon which existed between 1974 and 1996, but North Somerset Council rejected the proposal. The Councils of Bristol, South Gloucestershire and Bath and North East Somerset agreed to proceed with the deal without North Somerset.

The authority's functions, as specified by the West of England Combined Authority Order, mostly cover planning, skills and local transport.

The first election for the position of Mayor of the West of England took place on 4 May 2017, and was won by Tim Bowles of the Conservatives with a total of 70,300 votes, including second preferences. The turnout was 29.7%, with 199,519 voting out of the possible 671,280. The second election took place in 2021 and was won by Labour candidate and former MP for Wansdyke Dan Norris.

The Cabinet of the Combined Authority consists of the leaders of all three constituent councils, plus the Mayor of the West of England.

Westminster representation
 No seats changed parties in 2019.
The names of parliamentary constituencies in Bristol were changed in 1885 when the original Bristol (UK Parliament constituency) was split into four and they were revised further in the 20th century.

There are now four Westminster constituencies that are part of Bristol proper—Bristol West, Bristol East, Bristol South and Bristol North West.

Parts of Greater Bristol outside the Bristol City Council administrative area, are covered by the Filton and Bradley Stoke and Kingswood constituencies in South Gloucestershire, the eponymous constituency of North Somerset in North Somerset, and North East Somerset in the authority of Bath and North East Somerset.

See also
 Bristol City Council elections
 2010 United Kingdom general election results in Bristol
 History of local government in Bristol
 History of Bristol City Council
 List of parliamentary constituencies in Avon
 Politics of the United Kingdom

References

External links

 Bristol City Council
 Parties: Conservative, Green, Labour, Liberal Democrat
 OpenlyLocal page on Bristol City Council

Video clips
 Bristol City Council YouTube channel